Vishwa Bharti College of Education is a branch of a large educational complex, known as Vishwa Bharti Women's Welfare Institution established in the year 1951. The college is recognised by J&K State Govt. and is affiliated to the University of Kashmir.

Women's universities and colleges in Jammu and Kashmir
Colleges affiliated to University of Kashmir
Degree colleges in Kashmir Division